Real Chukai Football Club (Malay: Kelab Bola Real Chukai), is a Malaysian professional football club based in Chukai, Terengganu. The club currently competes in the Malaysia M4 League, the fourth division of the Malaysian football league.

History
Founded in 2015, Real Chukai made club debut into Malaysian football by joining the fifth-tier league Malaysia M5 League in 2015. The club won the first title in 2017 after beating the PBSMT-Lanjerket in final of TAL Cup.

In 2018, Real Chukai competed in the Malaysia FA Cup for the first time in the club's history.

The Anchors emerged as the first amateur club in Terengganu to manage its own stadium facilities through Glorious Innovation Sdn. Bhd. which is incorporated and has the concept of public -private cooperation.

Since they started playing, Real Chukai have had a fierce rivalry with Kerteh FC, the other Kemaman-based side. The rivalry between the two clubs has been dubbed Kemaman Derby by the supporters of both clubs.

Kit manufacturer and sponsorship

Players

First-team squad

Management team

Club personnel

Coaches

Honours

League
 TAL Premier League
 Runners-up : 2018
 Selangor Champion League All Star
 Champion : 2018

Cup
TAL Cup
 Winners : 2017

References

2015 establishments in Malaysia
Football clubs in Malaysia
Sport in Terengganu